Sandra Braman is a full professor in the Department of Communication at Texas A&M University.

Braman's work on the macro-level effects of digital technologies and their policy implications has been supported by the United States National Science Foundation and by the Ford, Rockefeller, and Soros Foundations. Her recent work includes Change of State: Information, Policy, and Power (MIT Press, 2007/2009) and the edited volumes Communication Researchers and Policy-making (MIT Press, 2003), Biotechnology and Communication:  The Meta-Technologies of Information (Erlbaum, 2004), and The Emergent Global Information Policy Regime (Palgrave Macmillan, 2004). In recent years, Braman has also served as the Freedom of Expression Professor at the University of Bergen (Norway), visiting professor at the Federal University of Rio de Janeiro (Brazil), and visiting professor and FIRST Scholar at the University of Colorado-Boulder.

Among Braman's noteworthy achievements, she has served as chair of the Communication Law & Policy Division of the International Communication Association, sits on the editorial boards of nine scholarly journals, and in 1997-1998 designed and implemented the first graduate-level program in telecommunication and information policy on the African continent, for the University of South Africa.

Prior to her current appointment, Braman was a professor of communication at the University of Wisconsin–Milwaukee, served as Reese Phifer Professor at the University of Alabama, Henry Rutgers Research Fellow at Rutgers University, research assistant professor at the University of Illinois Urbana-Champaign, and the Silha Fellow of Media Law and Ethics at the University of Minnesota.

References

Year of birth missing (living people)
Living people
Texas A&M University faculty
Academic staff of the University of Bergen
Academic staff of the Federal University of Rio de Janeiro
University of Colorado Boulder faculty
University of Wisconsin–Milwaukee faculty
University of Alabama faculty
Rutgers University faculty
University of Illinois Urbana-Champaign faculty
University of Minnesota fellows